Toni Myers (29 September 1943 – 18 February 2019) was a Canadian film editor, writer, director, and producer, best known for her 3D IMAX work. Her most recent film was 2016's A Beautiful Planet.

Selected filmography
Blue Planet (1990) (writer, editor, and narrator)
Destiny in Space (1994) (writer)
Mission to Mir (1997) (producer)
Space Station 3D (2002) (writer, producer, editor, and director)
Under the Sea (2009) (producer, writer)
Hubble (2010) (writer, producer, editor, and director)
A Beautiful Planet (2016) (writer, producer, and director)

References

External links

1943 births
2019 deaths
Canadian women film directors
Canadian women screenwriters
Canadian film editors
Canadian women film editors